Skeda udde is a locality situated in Linköping Municipality, Östergötland County, Sweden with 283 inhabitants in 2010.

References 

Populated places in Östergötland County
Populated places in Linköping Municipality